Carlo Emanuele Pio di Savoia (5 January 1585 in Ferrara – 1 June 1641 in Rome) was an Italian cardinal of the Pio di Savoia family. He was the uncle of Cardinal Carlo Pio di Savoia.

Life
His father was Enea Pio di Savoia, Signore di Sassuolo, Consigliere di Stato in Piedmont (1572), knight of the Ordine dell'Annunziata (1576), Piedmontese ambassador to Rome and (from 1591) governor of Reggio. Carlo's mother was Enea's second wife Barbara Turchi, daughter of Ippolito Turchi, first count of Crespino e Ariano, and of Ippolita Tassoni Estense. 

He was made cardinal deacon on 9 June 1604 by pope Clement VIII, and made deacon of San Nicola in Carcere on 25 June 1604. Under pope Urban VIII he was made deacon of Santa Maria in Via Lata on 2 October 1623, and then deacon of Santi Giovanni e Paolo and San Lorenzo in Lucina on 16 March 1626.

He was papal legate of the Marche in 1621, cardinal bishop of Albano from 14 June 1627, cardinal bishop of Porto and Santa Rufina from 15 June 1630, cardinal bishop of Velletri from 1638, bishop of Ostia from 28 March 1639.

References

Fonti
The Cardinals of the Holy Roman Church Biographical Dictionary Pope Clement VIII (1592–1605) Consistory of 9 June 1604 (VI)

1585 births
1641 deaths
17th-century Italian cardinals